In Between or related spellings may refer to:

Film and television
 In Between, a 1991 film featuring Alexandra Paul
 In Between (1994 film), a Hong Kong romantic anthology film
 In Between (2005 film), a film with a score by Suzanne Davis
 In Between (2016 film), a French-Israeli film by Maysaloun Hamoud
 In Between (miniseries), a 1987 Australian television miniseries
 In Between (TV series), a 2012 Taiwanese drama
The InBetween, a 2019 American supernatural drama television series
 The In-Between (2019 film), an American film by Mindy Bledsoe
 The In Between, a 2022 American film

Music

Albums
 In Between (Jazzanova album), 2002
 In Between (Onry Ozzborn album) or the title song, 2005
 In Between (Paul van Dyk album) or the title song, 2007
 In Between, by the Feelies, 2017
 In Between, a 2010 EP by Erik Truffaz
 In Between, a 2001 EP by Rosie Thomas
 Inbetween, a 2002 album by Bubbles
The Inbetween, a 2014 album by Scarlet White
 The In Between (album), or the title song by Booker Ervin, 1968

Songs
 "In Between" (song), by Scotty McCreery, 2019
 "In Between", by 6lack from Free 6lack, 2016
 "In Between", by Beartooth from Disgusting, 2014
 "In Between", by Collective Soul from Disciplined Breakdown, 1997
 "In Between", by Julian Lennon from Everything Changes, 2013
 "In Between", by Kelsea Ballerini from Unapologetically, 2017
 "In Between", by Linkin Park from Minutes to Midnight, 2007
 "The In-Between" (song), by Evanescence

See also
Acey Deucey (card game), also known as in-between
Inbetweening, a process in animation
Inbetweener (disambiguation)
Between (disambiguation)